William, Will, Bill or Billy Griffiths may refer to:

Sports
 William Griffiths (boxer) (born 1932), Australian Olympic boxer
 William Griffiths (field hockey) (1922–2010), British Olympic hockey player
 Will Griffiths (rugby union) (born 1998), Welsh rugby union player
 Bill Griffiths (footballer, born 1879) (1879–1928), Australian rules footballer
 Bill Griffiths (footballer, born 1896) (1896–1970), Australian rules footballer
 Billy Griffiths (footballer, born 1876), (1876–1946), English footballer

Others
 William Griffiths (VC) (1841–1879), Irish recipient of the Victoria Cross
 William Griffiths (politician) (1912–1973), British politician 
 Hugh Griffiths, Baron Griffiths (William Hugh Griffiths, 1923–2015), British soldier, cricketer, judge and life peer
 William Garonwy Griffiths (born 1955), American author
 Bill Griffiths (poet) (1948–2007), British poet and scholar
 Billy Griffiths (writer), Australian historian and writer

See also
 Billy Griffith (Stewart Cathie Griffith, 1914–1993), cricketer and cricket administrator
 Robert William Griffiths (1896–1962), Welsh farmer and businessman
 William Griffith (disambiguation)